Brachylampis is a genus of fireflies in the family Lampyridae. There are at least two described species in Brachylampis.

Species
These two species belong to the genus Brachylampis.
 Brachylampis blaisdelli Van Dyke, 1939
 Brachylampis sanguinicollis Van Dyke, 1939

References

Further reading

 
 
 
 
 
 

Lampyridae